Pertang is a mukim in Jelebu District, Negeri Sembilan, Malaysia. Simpang Pertang is located near the town. Near Pertang there is also a village named Jelebu Estate that is about 5 km away. The new village Titi is another 5 km away.

Jelebu District
Mukims of Negeri Sembilan